The United States Department of Energy (DOE) is an executive department of the U.S. federal government that oversees U.S. national energy policy and manages the research and development of nuclear power and nuclear weapons in the United States. The DOE oversees the U.S. nuclear weapons program, nuclear reactor production for the United States Navy, energy-related research, and domestic energy production and energy conservation.

The DOE was created in 1977 in the aftermath of the 1973 oil crisis. It sponsors more physical science research than any other U.S. federal agency, the majority of which is conducted through its system of National Laboratories. The DOE also directs research in genomics, with the Human Genome Project originating from a DOE initiative.

The department is headed by the Secretary of Energy, who reports directly to the president of the United States and is a member of the Cabinet. The current Secretary of Energy is Jennifer Granholm, who has served in the position since February 2021. The department's headquarters are in southwestern Washington, D.C., in the James V. Forrestal Building, with additional offices in Germantown, Maryland.

History

Formation and consolidation
In 1942, during World War II, the United States started the Manhattan Project, a project to develop the atomic bomb, under the eye of the U.S. Army Corps of Engineers. After the war in 1946, the Atomic Energy Commission (AEC) was created to control the future of the project. The Atomic Energy Act of 1946 also created the framework for the first National Laboratories. Among other nuclear projects, the AEC produced fabricated uranium fuel cores at locations such as Fernald Feed Materials Production Center in Cincinnati, Ohio. The Energy Reorganization Act of 1974 split the responsibilities of the AEC into to the new Nuclear Regulatory Commission, which was tasked with regulating the nuclear power industry, and the Energy Research and Development Administration, which was tasked to manage the nuclear weapon, naval reactor, and energy development programs.

The 1973 oil crisis called attention to the need to consolidate energy policy. On August 4, 1977, President Jimmy Carter signed into law The Department of Energy Organization Act of 1977, which created the Department of Energy. The new agency, which began operations on October 1, 1977, consolidated the Federal Energy Administration, the Energy Research and Development Administration, the Federal Power Commission, and programs of various other agencies. Former Secretary of Defense James Schlesinger, who served under Presidents Nixon and Ford during the Vietnam War, was appointed as the first secretary.

President Carter created the Department of Energy with the goal of promoting energy conservation and developing alternative sources of energy. He wanted to not be dependent on foreign oil and reduce the use of fossil fuels. With international energy's future uncertain for America, Carter acted quickly to have the department come into action the first year of his presidency. This was an extremely important issue of the time as the oil crisis was causing shortages and inflation.  With the Three-Mile Island disaster, Carter was able to intervene with the help of the department. Carter made switches within the Nuclear Regulatory Commission in this case to fix the management and procedures. This was possible as nuclear energy and weapons are responsibility of the Department of Energy.

Weapon plans stolen 

In December 1999, the FBI was investigating how China obtained plans for a specific nuclear device. Wen Ho Lee was accused of stealing nuclear secrets from Los Alamos National Laboratory for the People's Republic of China. Federal officials, including then-Energy Secretary Bill Richardson, publicly named Lee as a suspect before he was charged with a crime. The United States Congress held hearings to investigate the Department of Energy's mishandling of his case. Republican senators thought that an independent agency should be in charge of nuclear weapons and security issues, not the Department of Energy. All but one of the 59 charges against Lee were eventually dropped because the investigation finally proved that the plans the Chinese obtained could not have come from Lee. Lee filed suit and won a $1.6 million settlement against the federal government and news agencies. The episode eventually led to the creation of the National Nuclear Security Administration, a semi-autonomous agency within the department.

Loan guarantee program of 2005 
In 2001, American Solar Challenge was sponsored by the United States Department of Energy and the National Renewable Energy Laboratory. After the 2005 race, the U.S. Department of Energy discontinued its sponsorship.

Title XVII of Energy Policy Act of 2005 authorizes the DOE to issue loan guarantees to eligible projects that "avoid, reduce, or sequester air pollutants or anthropogenic emissions of greenhouse gases" and "employ new or significantly improved technologies as compared to technologies in service in the United States at the time the guarantee is issued". In loan guarantees, a conditional commitment requires to meet an equity commitment, as well as other conditions, before the loan guarantee is completed.

The United States Department of Energy, the Nuclear Threat Initiative (NTI), the Institute of Nuclear Materials Management (INMM), and the International Atomic Energy Agency (IAEA) partnered to develop and launch the World Institute for Nuclear Security (WINS) in September 2008. WINS is an international non-governmental organization designed to provide a forum to share best practices in strengthening the security and safety of nuclear and radioactive materials and facilities.

Recent
On March 28, 2017, a supervisor in the Office of International Climate and Clean Energy asked staff to avoid the phrases "climate change," "emissions reduction," or "Paris Agreement" in written memos, briefings or other written communication. A DOE spokesperson denied that phrases had been banned.

In a May 2019 press release concerning natural gas exports from a Texas facility, the DOE used the term 'freedom gas' to refer to natural gas. The phrase originated from a speech made by Secretary Rick Perry in Brussels earlier that month. Washington Governor Jay Inslee decried the term "a joke".

Organization 

The department announced a reorganization with new names of under secretaries in 2022.

The department is under the control and supervision of a United States Secretary of Energy, a political appointee of the President of the United States. The Energy Secretary is assisted in managing the department by a United States Deputy Secretary of Energy, also appointed by the president, who assumes the duties of the secretary in the secretary's absence. The department also has three under secretaries, each appointed by the president, who oversee the major areas of the department's work. The president also appoints seven officials with the rank of Assistant Secretary of Energy who have line management responsibility for major organizational elements of the department. The Energy Secretary assigns their functions and duties.

Symbolism in the seal 
Excerpt from the Code of Federal Regulations, in Title 10: Energy:

The official seal of the Department of Energy "includes a green shield bisected by a gold-colored lightning bolt, on which is emblazoned a gold-colored symbolic sun, atom, oil derrick, windmill, and dynamo. It is crested by the white head of an eagle, atop a white rope. Both appear on a blue field surrounded by concentric circles in which the name of the agency, in gold, appears on a green background."

"The eagle represents the care in planning and the purposefulness of efforts required to respond to the Nation's increasing demands for energy. The sun, atom, oil derrick, windmill, and dynamo serve as representative technologies whose enhanced development can help meet these demands. The rope represents the cohesiveness in the development of the technologies and their link to our future capabilities. The lightning bolt represents the power of the natural forces from which energy is derived and the Nation's challenge in harnessing the forces."

"The color scheme is derived from nature, symbolizing both the source of energy and the support of man's existence. The blue field represents air and water, green represents mineral resources and the earth itself, and gold represents the creation of energy in the release of natural forces. By invoking this symbolism, the color scheme represents the Nation's commitment to meet its energy needs in a manner consistent with the preservation of the natural environment."

Facilities 
The Department of Energy operates a system of national laboratories and technical facilities for research and development, as follows:

 Ames Laboratory
 Argonne National Laboratory
 Brookhaven National Laboratory
 Fermi National Accelerator Laboratory
 Idaho National Laboratory
 Lawrence Berkeley National Laboratory
 Lawrence Livermore National Laboratory
 Los Alamos National Laboratory
 National Energy Technology Laboratory
 National Renewable Energy Laboratory
 Oak Ridge National Laboratory
 Pacific Northwest National Laboratory
 Princeton Plasma Physics Laboratory
 Sandia National Laboratories
 Savannah River National Laboratory
 SLAC National Accelerator Laboratory
 Thomas Jefferson National Accelerator Facility

Other major DOE facilities include:

 Albany Research Center
 Bettis Atomic Power Laboratory – under NNSA designs/develops nuclear-powered propulsion for the U.S. Navy
 Kansas City National Security Campus
 Knolls Atomic Power Laboratory – under NNSA designs/develops nuclear-powered propulsion for the U.S. Navy
 National Petroleum Technology Office
 Nevada National Security Site
 New Brunswick Laboratory
 Office of Fossil Energy
 Office of River Protection
 Pantex Plant
 Radiological and Environmental Sciences Laboratory
 Savannah River Site—separate from Savannah River National Laboratory
 Y-12 National Security Complex
 Yucca Mountain nuclear waste repository

Airstrip:
 Pahute Mesa Airstrip – Nye County, Nevada, part of Nevada National Security Site

Nuclear weapons sites

The DOE/NNSA has federal responsibility for the design, testing and production of all nuclear weapons. NNSA in turn uses contractors to carry out its responsibilities at the following government owned sites:
 Research, development, and manufacturing guidance: Los Alamos National Laboratory and Lawrence Livermore National Laboratory
 Engineering of the non-nuclear components and system integration: Sandia National Laboratories
 Manufacturing of key components: The Kansas City Plant, Savannah River Site and Y-12 National Security Complex.
 Testing: Nevada Test Site
 Final weapon and warhead assembling and dismantling: Pantex

Related legislation 

 1920 – Federal Power Act
 1935 – Public Utility Holding Company Act of 1935
 1946 – Atomic Energy Act PL 79-585 (created the Atomic Energy Commission) [Superseded by the Atomic Energy Act of 1954]
 1954 – Atomic Energy Act of 1954, as Amended PL 83-703
 1956 – Colorado River Storage Project PL 84-485
 1957 – Atomic Energy Commission Acquisition of Property PL 85-162
 1957 – Price-Anderson Nuclear Industries Indemnity Act PL 85-256
 1968 – Natural Gas Pipeline Safety Act PL 90-481
 1973 – Mineral Leasing Act Amendments (Trans-Alaska Oil Pipeline Authorization) PL 93-153
 1974 – Energy Reorganization Act PL 93-438 (Split the AEC into the Energy Research and Development Administration and the Nuclear Regulatory Commission)
 1975 – Energy Policy and Conservation Act PL 94-163
 1977 – Department of Energy Organization Act PL 95-91 (Dismantled ERDA and replaced it with the Department of Energy)
 1978 – National Energy Act PL 95-617, 618, 619, 620, 621
 1980 – Energy Security Act PL 96-294
 1989 – Natural Gas Wellhead Decontrol Act PL 101-60
 1992 – Energy Policy Act of 1992 PL 102-486
 2000 – National Nuclear Security Administration Act PL 106-65
 2005 – Energy Policy Act of 2005 PL 109-58
 2007 – Energy Independence and Security Act of 2007 PL 110-140
 2008 – Food, Conservation, and Energy Act of 2008 PL 110-234

Budget 
On May 7, 2009 President Barack Obama unveiled a $26.4 billion budget request for DOE for fiscal year (FY) 2010, including $2.3 billion for the DOE Office of Energy Efficiency and Renewable Energy (EERE). That budget aimed to substantially expand the use of renewable energy sources while improving energy transmission infrastructure. It also proposed significant investments in hybrids and plug-in hybrids, smart grid technologies, and scientific research and innovation.

As part of the $789 billion economic stimulus package in the American Recovery and Reinvestment Act of 2009, Congress provided Energy with an additional $38.3 billion for fiscal years 2009 and 2010, adding about 75 percent to Energy's annual budgets. Most of the stimulus spending was in the form of grants and contracts. For fiscal year 2013, each of the operating units of the Department of Energy operated with the following budgets:

In March 2018, Energy Secretary Rick Perry testified to a Senate panel about the Trump administration's DOE budget request for fiscal year 2019. The budget request prioritizes nuclear security while making large cuts to energy efficiency and renewable energy programs. The proposal is a $500 million increase in funds over fiscal year 2017. It "promotes innovations like a new Office of Cybersecurity, Energy Security, and Emergency Response (CESER) and gains for the Office of Fossil Energy. Investments would be made to strengthen the National Nuclear Security Administration and modernize the nuclear force, as well as in weapons activities and advanced computing." However, the budget for the Office of Energy Efficiency and Renewable Energy would be lowered to $696 million under the plan, down from $1.3 billion in fiscal year 2017. Overall, the department's energy and related programs would be cut by $1.9 billion.

Programs and contracts

Energy Savings Performance Contract 

Energy Savings Performance Contracts (ESPCs) are contracts under which a contractor designs, constructs, and obtains the necessary financing for an energy savings project, and the federal agency makes payments over time to the contractor from the savings in the agency's utility bills. The contractor guarantees the energy improvements will generate savings, and after the contract ends, all continuing cost savings accrue to the federal agency.

Energy Innovation Hubs 
Energy Innovation Hubs are multi-disciplinary, meant to advance highly promising areas of energy science and technology from their early stages of research to the point that the risk level will be low enough for industry to commercialize the technologies. The Consortium for Advanced Simulation of Light Water Reactors (CASL) was the first DOE Energy Innovation Hub established in July 2010, for the purpose of providing advanced modeling and simulation (M&S) solutions for commercial nuclear reactors.

The 2009 DOE budget includes $280 million to fund eight Energy Innovation Hubs, each of which is focused on a particular energy challenge. Two of the eight hubs are included in the EERE budget and will focus on integrating smart materials, designs, and systems into buildings to better conserve energy and on designing and discovering new concepts and materials needed to convert solar energy into electricity. Another two hubs, included in the DOE Office of Science budget, were created to tackle the challenges of devising advanced methods of energy storage and creating fuels directly from sunlight without the use of plants or microbes. Yet another hub was made to develop "smart" materials to allow the electrical grid to adapt and respond to changing conditions.

In 2012, the DOE awarded $120 million to the Ames Laboratory to start a new EIH, the Critical Materials Institute, which will focus on improving the supply of rare earth elements.

Advanced Research Projects Agency-Energy

ARPA-E was officially created by the America COMPETES Act , authored by Congressman Bart Gordon, within the United States Department of Energy (DOE) in 2007, though without a budget. The initial budget of about $400 million was a part of the economic stimulus bill of February 2009.

Other
 DOE Isotope Program - Coordinates isotope production.
 Federal Energy Management Program
 Fusion Energy Sciences - program to research nuclear fusion, with a yearly budget in 2020 of $670 million, with $250 million of that going to ITER
 GovEnergy - an annual event partly sponsored by the DOE
 National Science Bowl - a high school and middle school science knowledge competition
 Solar Decathlon - international collegiate competition to design and build solar-powered houses
 State Energy Program
 Weatherization Assistance Program

List of Secretaries of Energy

See also 
 
 Federal Energy Regulatory Commission  
 National Council on Electricity Policy
 United States federal executive departments

References

Further reading

External links 

 
 Department of Energy in the Federal Register
 Department of Energy on USAspending.gov
 
 
 Advanced Energy Initiative
 Twenty In Ten

 
1977 establishments in Washington, D.C.
Government agencies established in 1977
Energy